Veronica Mary Whall (1887–1967) was an important stained glass artist, painter, and illustrator associated with the Arts and Crafts Movement. Her father,  Christopher Whall, was the leader of the Arts and Crafts Movement in stained glass. She was educated in the techniques of painting and stained glass making in her father's studio-workshop. She later became his studio assistant and designer for his studio in 1914. In 1922, Whall and her father co-founded a stained glass studio together, which she managed for nearly thirty years after his death in 1924.

Early life and education
Veronica Whall was born in 1887 in Stonebridge, near Dorking, Surrey. She showed artistic talent at a very young age and was only 13 when she drew Saint Catherine as part of a window for the Lady Chapel of Gloucester Cathedral. Whall, her mother, and her siblings were often used by her father as models for his stained glass designs.

Whall attended the L.C.C. Central School of Arts and Crafts, including classes taught by her father. Like other talented students at the school, Whall worked as a student apprentice at her father's studio-workshop.

Career
Whall was employed by her father, Christopher Whall as a studio assistant after she graduated from the Central School of Arts and Crafts. She and other assistants worked with Christoper Whall in completing the many stained glass commissions that Whall's studio-workshop created. In addition to the successful career as a stained glass artist, she also painted. One of her works, The Elf Hour, was a Victorian fairy watercolour painting. In 1907 it was exhibited during the summer at the New Gallery in London. 

In the 1911 census, Whall gave her occupation as a self-employed "Artist in water colour".  In 1912 she illustrated and coloured by hand a limited edition book for John Lyly entitled Cupid & Campaspe. She also wrote, illustrated and coloured by hand her own book, The Story of Peterkin in the Wood, which was printed by her brother Hew B. Whall in 1912. She exhibited some of her works at the 1914 Decorative Arts exhibition in Paris.

Like her father, she collaborated with Charles Sydney Spooner, who taught at the Central School of Art. In 1916, Spooner led the team who worked on the Apsidal Chapel created for display at the Arts and Crafts Exhibition Society 11th Exhibition, October–November 1916 at the Royal Academy of Arts. Whall and her father worked on the chapel's frieze. She was promoted to designer in her father's studio in 1914, and worked as designer until 1918.

In 1922, Whall and her father opened a studio together which they both co-directed. When Christopher Whall died in 1924, Whall managed the studio, assisted by her brother Christopher, until the studio closed in 1953. Whall & Whall, during its time, completed numerous stained glass works for cathedrals in England, Australia and New Zealand.

In 1953, Whall  moved to Huntingdonshire, devoting much of her time to goat-keeping. She died in 1967.

Stained glass works

Whall was a prominent and well respected stained glass artist during her career. She completed many stained glass commissions during her lifetime, initially working for Christopher Whall's studio workshop and later at the Whall & Whall studio. Many of her works outside the United Kingdom are to be found in New Zealand, such as those at the Christchurch Nurses' Memorial Chapel,Commissioned by Joseph Davis, Whall made for Whalley Methodist Church, St. Francis of Assisi and The Madonna and Child windows. These windows are said to be among her best works.

She created 73 windows for King Arthur's Hall, Tintagel, Cornwall, that opened in 1933. As of 1997 it is considered to be the largest collection of stained glass panels of King Arthur made in the 20th century and a great example of Arts and Crafts workmanship.

See also 
 Christopher Whall
 Mary Lowndes
 Wilhelmina Geddes
 Margaret Redmond
 Arts and Crafts movement

Notes

References

Further reading
 Peter Cormack. Women Stained Glass Artists of the Arts & Crafts Movement. London Borough of Waltham Forest, William Morris Gallery, 1985. pp. 17–19. 
 Whall & Whall, Ltd. Designs of the Glazing of Public & Domestic Buildings by V.M. Whall, Whall & Whall, Ltd., 1 Ravenscourt Park, W.6: (Whall & Whall, Ltd. ... Notes on Plain-glazing.). privately printed, 1922* (28 pages).
 Whall & Whall, Ltd. Whall & Whall, Ltd., Stained Glass Workers: Founded in 1887 by Christopher Whitworth Whall. Baynard Press, 1922. (8 pages).
 Whall & Whall, Ltd. Whall & Whall, Ltd., Stained Glass Artists: List of Windows. 1929.

External links

 King Arthur's Great Halls
 Nurses Memorial Chapel, Christchurch

British stained glass artists and manufacturers
1887 births
1967 deaths
Christopher Whall
English illustrators
Alumni of the Central School of Art and Design
English women artists